Archaeology in Tamil Nadu is mainly done under the supervision of Archaeological Survey of India and Tamil Nadu State Department of Archaeology. , excavations have been done at 40 sites and 36 reports have been issued.

The excavated sites are as follows.

List of District Archaeological Site Museums

References 

Archaeological sites in Tamil Nadu
Tamil Nadu-related lists